The Men's Pentathlon P12 had its competition held on September 12, with the Long Jump starting at 9:00 and the 1,500m - the last event - at 19:25.

Medalists

Results

Long Jump

Javelin Throw

100 metres

Discus Throw

1,500 metres

Final classification

References
Long Jump
Javelin Throw
100m Heat 1
100m Heat 2
100m Heat 3
100m Heat 4
Discus Throw
1500m Heat 1
1500m Heat 2

Athletics at the 2008 Summer Paralympics